Veterans Memorial Bridge, also called the Beverly-Salem Bridge, is a fixed-span roadway crossing of the Danvers River carrying Massachusetts Route 1A between Salem and Beverly, Massachusetts. It opened in 1997, replacing a previous historic steel bridge at the same location.

History
The Veterans Memorial Bridge is located at the site of the historic Essex Bridge. Originally a ferry crossed the Danvers River at the location from 1636 to 1788, then the first bridge was built. Rebuilt several times until 1896 when a steel pony truss swing bridge with trestle approaches was constructed by the county. It was constructed by the King Bridge Company of Cleveland, Ohio. Part of the cost of the 1896 bridge was covered by the Bay State Street Railway, which operated on a track over the bridge until 1934. The trolley tracks were later removed.

By the early 1990s the steel bridge had deteriorated to a point where it had to be demolished. It was replaced by the current span in 1997.

Current span
The Veterans Memorial Bridge contains seven main spans with the longest measuring 220 feet. It also contains four approach spans ranging between 60 and 160 feet in length. The current bridge is typical of MassDOT's preference for use of weathering steel for steel bridges.

Extras
The Veterans Memorial Bridge is featured in the VHS, Popular Mechanics For Kids: How Do They Build Bridges, while the bridge was under construction in 1997 as an example of a beam bridge.

See also

References

Bridges completed in 1896
Bridges completed in 1997
Monuments and memorials in Massachusetts
Beam bridges in the United States
Road bridges in Massachusetts
Steel bridges in the United States
Bridges in Essex County, Massachusetts